Eugenio Pereira Salas (May 19, 1904 - November 17, 1979) was a Chilean historian.

Works
The origins of Musical Art in Chile (1941)
Colonial Games and Joys in Chile (1947)
Notes on the History of Chilean Cuisine (1943)
Bibliographical Guide to the Study of Chilean Folklore (1952)
Pepe Vila. The Zarzuela Girl in Chile (1952)
South America. Peru - Bolivia - Paraguay - Argentina - Chile. National Period (1956)
History of Music in Chile (1850 - 1900) (1957)
Art History in the Kingdom of Chile (1965)
The First Contacts Between Chile and the United States, 1778 - 1808 (1971)
Theatre History in Chile From its Origins to the Death of John Casacuberta, one thousand eight hundred forty-eight (1974)
Notes on the History of Chilean Cuisine (1977)
Biobibliography Musical Backgrounds into Chile from 1886 (1978)
Research on the History of Art in Chile Republican (1992, posthumous)

References

20th-century Chilean historians
20th-century Chilean male writers
1904 births
1979 deaths
University of Chile alumni
People from Santiago